Daniel Bishop Meigs (June 1, 1835 – July 6, 1916) was a Canadian politician.

Born in Henryville, Lower Canada, his parents were both native of Swanton, Vermont, who moved in Canada in 1832. Meigs was educated in Bedford and was a farmer. He was mayor of Farnham, Quebec for several years. He was first elected to the House of Commons of Canada for the Quebec electoral district of Missisquoi in an 1888 by-election held after the death of the sitting MP, George Clayes. He was defeated in the 1891 election but was elected in 1896 election. A Liberal, he was re-elected again in the 1900, 1904, and 1908 elections. He did not stand for re-election in 1911.

References
 
 The Canadian Parliament; biographical sketches and photo-engravures of the senators and members of the House of Commons of Canada. Being the tenth Parliament, elected November 3, 1904

1835 births
1916 deaths
Liberal Party of Canada MPs
Mayors of places in Quebec
Members of the House of Commons of Canada from Quebec